The Oxford Philharmonic Orchestra is a British professional symphony orchestra based in Oxford and is the Orchestra in Residence at the University of Oxford. It was founded in 
1998 by Marios Papadopoulos as the Oxford Philomusica and was renamed the Oxford Philharmonic Orchestra in 2015.

References

External links 
 Oxford Philharmonic Orchestra website

British symphony orchestras
Music in Oxford
Musical groups established in 1998
Organisations associated with the University of Oxford